William Pond Baker (born June 14, 1940, in Oakland, California) is an American businessman and politician who served two terms as a United States Congressman from California from 1993 to 1997.

Biography 
He attended San Jose State University, from which he earned a business degree. Baker served as a member of the United States Coast Guard reserve from 1957 to 1965.

After graduating from college, Baker worked as a budget analyst for a large financial corporation. He then took a similar job with the California Department of Finance, which he held for four years. Baker worked as the vice president of a Taxpayers Association until he successfully ran for a seat in the California State Assembly as a Republican in 1980. He served six terms in a district that included portions of Contra Costa and Alameda Counties.

Congress 
In 1992, Baker ran for Congress and served two terms in the House before losing reelection in 1996 to Ellen Tauscher. Baker was a political conservative.

After Congress 
After leaving Congress, Baker returned to the field of finance, and was a partner in the Baker, Brose & Mitsutome investment management firm.

Electoral history

*Write-in and minor candidate notes:  In 1992, write-ins received 92 votes.  In 1996, Libertarian Gregory K. Lyon received 2,423 votes.

References

External links

Join California William P. "Bill" Baker

1940 births
Living people
Republican Party members of the California State Assembly
People from Contra Costa County, California
Politicians from Oakland, California
Republican Party members of the United States House of Representatives from California